Ann McQuaid (born 26 August 1951) is an Irish sprint canoer who competed in the early 1970s. She was eliminated in the repechages of the K-1 500 m event at the 1972 Summer Olympics in Munich.
Her father is Henry Mcquaid.

References
Sports-reference.com profile

1951 births
Canoeists at the 1972 Summer Olympics
Irish female canoeists
Living people
Olympic canoeists of Ireland
Place of birth missing (living people)